The Crazylegs Classic is an annual eight-kilometer running race and two-mile walk held each spring in Madison, Wisconsin, United States. The course starts at the Wisconsin State Capitol and ends at Camp Randall Stadium. The race, first held in 1982, was named in honor of Elroy "Crazylegs" Hirsch. Proceeds from the race benefit University of Wisconsin–Madison athletics programs.

The idea for the race was hatched in late 1981 by Tom Grantham, Ken Sparks, and Rich Backus, who wanted to raise money to support Wisconsin athletics. As admirers of Hirsch, who was then serving as UW–Madison's athletic director, they asked his permission to name it the "Crazylegs Run" in his honor. Grantham continues to serve as general chairman on the Crazylegs Classic Executive Committee.

The first race in 1982 attracted 1,525 runners and raised $9,500. The event grew in popularity and the walk was added in 1987 with 676 walkers the first year. The event has grown, reaching a record high of 20,415 registrants in 2010. Since its inaugural race, it has attracted more than 229,000 runners and walkers.

Runner's World magazine has rated the Crazylegs Classic as one of America's Best 100 Events. Readers participating in the Capital Times/Wisconsin State Journal Reader's Choice Award survey have voted the classic the #1 Favorite Local Running Event every year since 1995.

In 2002, the Road Runners Club of America chose the Crazylegs Classic one of twenty "Great Races! Great Places!" events.

The scenic race course is considered a "runner's delight," starting opposite the State Capitol Building, going down Wisconsin Avenue, moving onto the campus over Observatory Drive to Picnic Point and returning down University Avenue to Camp Randall where it ends at the 50 yard line.

References

External links
Crazylegs Classic website

Long-distance running competitions
Sports in Madison, Wisconsin
Foot races in Wisconsin